The IFFHS World's Best Club Coach is an association football award given annually, since 1996, to the most outstanding club coach as voted by the International Federation of Football History & Statistics (IFFHS), an autonomous football federation working without the investment or support of FIFA or UEFA. It is awarded to support the players with their performances. The votes in 1996 were cast by IFFHS's editorial staff, as well as experts from 89 countries spanning six continents. Since then, the votes have been now awarded by 81 experts and selected editorial offices from all of the continents. In 2020, an award for women's club coaches was introduced. The current men's recipient is Real Madrid coach Carlo Ancelotti. The current women's recipient is Lyon coach Jean-Luc Vasseur.

Public reception 
The award is officially recognised by FIFA despite the IFFHS not being affiliated with them. However, as the award is usually awarded based on statistics rather than individual merits, it is not held in high regard by some football fans. Four-time winner José Mourinho once jokingly stated that the IFFHS were slow in handing over the award claiming he had not received his award from 2010 in 2012.

Men's winners 
The award is awarded at the end of the year. The winning coach and the runner-up in the rankings are awarded a gold and silver trophy respectively at the World Football Gala. Below is a list of the previous men's winners and runners-up since the first award in 1996.

List of winners

Statistics

Continental winners 

 Bold indicates the World's Best Man Club Coach winner.

All-time World's Best Man Coach ranking (since 1996)

The World's Best Man Coach of the Decade (2001–2010) 
In 2011, the IFFHS awarded an additional award to coaches by combining the points awarded in the annual World's Best Club Coach awards, to the coach who had gained the most points collectively over the previous ten years to determine the best coach of the previous decade. This World Coach of the Decade award was awarded to Arsenal manager Arsène Wenger, despite the fact he had never won the annual World's Best Club Coach award.

The World's Best Man Club Coach of the Decade (2011–2020) 

In 2021, Atlético Madrid's manager Diego Simeone won the World's Best Man Club Coach of the Decade 2011–2020.

Women's winners 

The award is awarded at the end of the year. Below is a list of the previous women's winners and runners-up since the first award in 2020.

List of winners

Statistics

Continental winners 

 Bold indicates the World's Best Woman Club Coach winner.

See also 
International Federation of Football History & Statistics
IFFHS World's Best Club
IFFHS World's Best Player
IFFHS World's Best Goalkeeper
IFFHS World's Best Top Goal Scorer
IFFHS World's Best International Goal Scorer
IFFHS World Team
IFFHS World's Best National Coach

References

External links 
IFFHS's page on the World's Best Club Coach award

International Federation of Football History & Statistics
Association football trophies and awards
IFFHS